Capu Dealului may refer to several villages in Romania:

 Capu Dealului, a village in Cenade Commune, Alba County
 Capu Dealului, a village in Brănești, Gorj
 Capu Dealului, a village in the town of Băbeni, Vâlcea County
 Capu Dealului, a village in the town of Drăgăşani, Vâlcea County